Hartsgrove Township is one of the twenty-seven townships of Ashtabula County, Ohio, United States. The 2010 census found 1,597 people in the township.

Geography
Located on the southwestern edge of the county, it borders the following townships:
Trumbull Township - north
Morgan Township - northeast corner
Rome Township - east
Orwell Township - southeast corner
Windsor Township - south
Huntsburg Township, Geauga County - southwest corner
Montville Township, Geauga County - west
Thompson Township, Geauga County - northwest corner

No municipalities are located in Hartsgrove Township.

Name and history
Hartsgrove Township was organized in 1830. It was named for Richard W. Hart, an early settler in the area and native of Connecticut.

Government
The township is governed by a three-member board of trustees, who are elected in November of odd-numbered years to a four-year term beginning on the following January 1. Two are elected in the year after the presidential election and one is elected in the year before it. There is also an elected township fiscal officer, who serves a four-year term beginning on April 1 of the year after the election, which is held in November of the year before the presidential election. Vacancies in the fiscal officership or on the board of trustees are filled by the remaining trustees.  Currently, the members of the board are Bruce Gottron, Paul Hall, and Robert Williams.

References

External links
Official Hartsgrove Township Website
County website

Townships in Ashtabula County, Ohio
1830 establishments in Ohio
Populated places established in 1830
Townships in Ohio